As Barbas do Imperador – D. Pedro II, um monarca nos trópicos (The Emperor's Beard: Dom Pedro II and His Tropical Monarchy in Brazil in English) is a non-fiction biography book written by Brazilian historian Lilia Moritz Schwarcz about the life and reign of Dom Pedro II, from his birth to his death. The book won the Prêmio Jabuti in 1999.

References

External links
As Barbas do Imperador from Companhia das Letras

1998 non-fiction books
Portuguese-language works
Brazilian biographies
Books about Brazil